Castlemont High School is a public high school in Oakland, California, United States, originally known as East Oakland High School.  It is part of the Oakland Unified School District. The Castlemont name was selected by a vote of the students.

Castlemont High School was founded in 1929 in a medieval-style building.  The architecture inspires many of the school traditions, such as the sports teams being named "Knights" and "Crusaders" and the school newspaper Ye Castle Crier.  The motto is "Build on and make thy castles high and fair, rising upward to the skies."

Its Basketball teams in, 1969, 1976, & 1979 were winners of the Tournament of Champions (T.O.C.), formerly the northern California championships, and its track team in 1975 Maurice Glass held high school indoor sprint record.  In 1983, Derrick Adams took first place in the 130 lbs wrestling California State Championship, the only Oakland Section person to ever place first in his weight class.

Former School Choir, "The Castleers", whose members in the 1970s toured the world performing a variety of songs that included R&B and gospel.

Castlemont Community of Small Schools
For an eight-year period, from 2004 to 2012, the large school housed three separate smaller schools called the Castlemont Community of Small Schools.  The smaller schools were known by the names:

 Castlemont Leadership Preparatory High (10-12)
 Castlemont Business and Information Technology School (10-12) (CBITIS)
 East Oakland School of the Arts (10-12)
 Freshman Prep Academy (FPA)

A similar smaller school experiment was going on at the Fremont Federation of High Schools.

The school opened back under the reunified name "Castlemont High School" in the fall of 2012.

Alumni 

Notable alumni of Castlemont Senior High School include: 
Carole Ward Allen, former BART director and Oakland port commissioner 
Charlie Brown (b. 1948), former NFL wide receiver for the Detroit Lions
Kali Muscle,  American actor, author, bodybuilder, and entertainer.
Randy Sparks, The Christie Minstrels.
Larry Graham, former bass player with Sly and the Family Stone
Steve Howard, former MLB player
Fred Korematsu, Japanese Internment protester
Leroy Reams, Major League Baseball player for Philadelphia Phillies
Joe Morgan (1943–2020), baseball Hall of Famer, class of 1962 
Clifford T. Robinson (Class of 1977), NBA Small forward
Fred Silva (b. 1927), NFL official from 1968 to 1988, referee for Super Bowl XIV
Steve Reeves (1926–2000) class of 1944 Most famous for his movie role of "Hercules", famous bodybuilder and actor. 
Gary Pettis (b. 1958) Major League Baseball player, current first base coach of the Houston Astros
June Pointer (1953-2006) American Pop/R&B singer, The Pointer Sisters
Richard "Dimples" Fields (1941-2000) American R&B and soul singer
Raphael Saadiq (b. 1966), American R&B singer
Betty Reid Soskin—oldest National Park Ranger serving the United States

References

External links 

 Official Castlemont Community of Small Schools website
 Castlemont High School Alumni Association
 San Francisco Chronicle news article regarding small schools
 Castlemont High School
 What’s Next for Castlemont?

Educational institutions established in 1929
Small schools movement
High schools in Oakland, California
Public high schools in California
1929 establishments in California
Oakland Unified School District